Derby Wharf Light Station is a historic lighthouse on Derby Wharf in Salem, Massachusetts that is within the Salem Maritime National Historic Site.

It was built in 1871 and added to the National Register of Historic Places in 1987. The United States Coast Guard Light List description is "White square tower. Maintained by the U.S. Park Service".

History
The Light Station was originally built in 1871 and used an oil lamp shining through a Fresnel lens. For many years, Derby Wharf Light had one of only 17 sixth-order Fresnel lenses in the United States. Today, the light is solar powered, and the light is a red flash every six seconds.

See also
Derby Waterfront District
National Register of Historic Places listings in Salem, Massachusetts
National Register of Historic Places listings in Essex County, Massachusetts

References

Lighthouses completed in 1871
Buildings and structures in Salem, Massachusetts
Lighthouses on the National Register of Historic Places in Massachusetts
Lighthouses in Essex County, Massachusetts
National Register of Historic Places in Salem, Massachusetts